Cameron Dantzler Sr. (born September 3, 1998) is an American football cornerback for the Washington Commanders of the National Football League (NFL). He played college football at Mississippi State and was selected in the third round of the 2020 NFL Draft by the Minnesota Vikings.

Early years
Dantzler attended Saint Thomas Aquinas High School in Hammond, Louisiana. He played cornerback and quarterback in high school. As a senior, he passed for 1,381 yards and 11 touchdowns and rushed for 1,901 yards and 26 touchdowns. He committed to Mississippi State University to play college football.

College career
Dantzler redshirted his true freshman season at Mississippi State. He played in all 13 of the Bulldogs' games as a redshirt freshman, finishing the season with 25 tackles (two for loss) with four passes defended and an interception, which came in the 2017 TaxSlayer Bowl when he picked off Heisman Trophy winner Lamar Jackson. Dantzler entered his redshirt sophomore season as a starter, finishing the season with 43 tackles (two for loss), a sack, two interceptions and a team-leading 11 passes defended and was named second-team All-SEC by the Associated Press. Additionally, Dantzler was one of only four cornerbacks in the conference not to surrender a touchdown pass and had a 41.1 passer rating allowed according to Pro Football Focus.

Dantzler entered his redshirt junior season on the watchlists for the Bednarik, Nagurski and Jim Thorpe Awards and was named a preseason All-American by Phil Steele.  After a 2019 season where he had 2 interceptions and 10 passes defend, Dantzler decided to forgo his last year of eligibility and declared for the 2020 NFL Draft.

Professional career

Minnesota Vikings
Dantzler was drafted in the third round (89th overall) by the Minnesota Vikings in the 2020 NFL Draft. He was placed on the reserve/COVID-19 list by the team on October 28, 2020, and activated three days later.

2020 season
Heading into his first training camp, Dantzler was listed as a starting cornerback opposite Mike Hughes.  He faced competition from fellow rookie Jeff Gladney for his starting job.  At the end of training camp, head coach Mike Zimmer named Dantzler the starting left cornerback opposite Hughes.  

Dantzler made his first career start and NFL debut in the Vikings’ season-opening loss to the Green Bay Packers.  He recorded four tackles in the 34-43 loss.  Dantzler missed Weeks 2 and 3 with a rib injury before returning as a starter in Week 4 against the Houston Texans, recording four tackles in the 31-23 win.  Dantzler started in the Vikings’ Week 5 and Week 6 games against the Seattle Seahawks and Atlanta Falcons, but was placed on the Reserve/COVID-19 list after coming into close contact with a teammate who tested positive for the virus.  He missed Week 7 before returning in the Vikings’ Week 8 win against the Packers.  Dantzler started the game and recorded 2 solo tackles before being carted off the field and taken to the hospital due to a serious neck injury. However, he was able to return in time for the Vikings’ Week 11 contest against the Dallas Cowboys.  In the Vikings’ Week 13 contest against the Jacksonville Jaguars, Dantzler recorded his first career interception off a pass thrown by Mike Glennon and forced a fumble on Chris Conley which he also recovered during the 27–24 overtime win. Dantzler finished his rookie season appearing in 11 games (10 starts) and recording 2 interceptions, 46 combined tackles, four passes defended, a forced fumble, and a fumble recovery.

2021 season
In a surprise move, the Vikings chose to make Dantzler a healthy inactive in the 2021 season opener against the Cincinnati Bengals. Following Week 3, head coach Mike Zimmer stated he would be speaking with Dantzler over the latter venting his frustration over his lack of playing time on his Twitter account.

2022 season
On November 12, 2022, Dantzler was placed on injured reserve due to an ankle injury and was later reactivated on December 10. He was released by the Vikings on March 10, 2023.

Washington Commanders
On March 13, 2023, Dantzler was claimed off waivers by the Washington Commanders.

References

External links
Washington Commanders bio
Mississippi State Bulldogs bio

1998 births
Living people
Sportspeople from Hammond, Louisiana
Players of American football from Louisiana
American football cornerbacks
Mississippi State Bulldogs football players
Minnesota Vikings players
Washington Commanders players